Centro Novo do Maranhão is a municipality in the state of Maranhão in the Northeast region of Brazil.

The municipality contains part of the  Gurupi Biological Reserve, a full protected conservation unit created in 1988.

See also
List of municipalities in Maranhão

References

Municipalities in Maranhão